Eunice Tietjens (July 29, 1884 – September 6, 1944) was an American poet, novelist, journalist, children's author, lecturer, and editor.

Early years and education
Eunice Strong Hammond was born in Chicago on July 29, 1884. She was educated in Europe and traveled extensively. She lived in Florida, New York City, Japan, China, Tahiti and Tunisia, among other places.

Career
Tietjens was a World War I correspondent for the Chicago Daily News in France, in 1917 and 1918. Her poems had already begun to be published in Poetry: A Magazine of Verse, the noted poetry magazine, around 1913. She later became publisher Harriet Monroe's associate editor there for more than twenty-five years.
Tietjens was considered a more patient and generous editor, whose style contrasted sharply with that of Monroe, who was not known to treat would-be contributors with "kid gloves".

One collection of stories, Burton Holmes Travel Stories: Japan, Korea and Formosa (1924) contains lively descriptions of East Asian countries. By contemporary standards, the stories seem provincial and quaintly Eurocentric. The stories contain descriptions of nationalities and ethnicities that can be understood to be racist. Here's an excerpt:

Tietjens was also a contributing editor for the Compton's Encyclopedia.

Personal life
Her first husband was Paul Tietjens, whom she married in Paris in 1904 and by whom she had two daughters, Idea and Janet. They divorced in 1914 in the aftermath of Idea's death, and she remarried in 1920 to Cloyd Head, playwright and theatrical director, by whom she had a son, Marshall Head.

She died in 1944 in her hometown of Chicago, aged 60 from cancer. Her papers may be found at: Newberry Library, Roger and Julie Baskes Department of Special Collections, 60 West Walton Street, Chicago, Illinois.

Poems
Old Friendship
The Steam Shovel
Presence of Eternity
The Great Man
The Most Sacred Mountain
The Drug Clerk
The Bacchante to Her Babe

References

External links 
 
 
 
Intimate Circles | Eunice Tietjens at highway49.library.yale.edu
Eunice Tietjens at Old Poetry at oldpoetry.com
Eunice Tietjens Papers at Newberry Library
Enuice Tietjens papers--additions at Newberry Library
 

1884 births
1944 deaths
American magazine editors
20th-century American novelists
American women novelists
20th-century American poets
American children's writers
Newbery Honor winners
Writers from Chicago
Deaths from cancer in Illinois
American women in World War I
American women journalists
American women poets
American women children's writers
20th-century American women writers
Novelists from Illinois
20th-century American non-fiction writers
Women magazine editors